The 2016 season of Atlético Petróleos de Luanda is the club's 35th season in the Girabola, the Angolan Premier football League and 35th consecutive season in the top flight of Angolan football. In 2016,  the club participated in the Girabola and the Angola Cup.

Squad information

Players

On loan

Pre-season transfers

Mid-season transfers

Staff

Overview

Angolan League

League table

Results

Results summary

Results by round

Match details

FESA Tournament

Preliminary round

3rd place match

Angola Cup

Round of 16

Quarter-finals

Semi-finals

Season statistics

Appearances and goals

|-
! colspan="10" style="background:#DCDCDC; text-align:center" | Goalkeepers

|-
! colspan="10" style="background:#DCDCDC; text-align:center" | Defenders

|-
! colspan="10" style="background:#DCDCDC; text-align:center" | Midfielders

|-
! colspan="10" style="background:#DCDCDC; text-align:center" | Forwards

|-
! colspan="10" style="background:#DCDCDC; text-align:center" | Opponents

|-
! colspan="10" style="background:#DCDCDC; text-align:center" | Total
|- align=center
| colspan="4"| || 308 || 42  ||  || 37 ||  || 5

Scorers

Clean sheets

See also
 List of Atlético Petróleos de Luanda players

External links
 Zerozero.pt profile

References

Atlético Petróleos de Luanda seasons
Petro de Luanda